Stephen Marshall (9 August 1985 – 16 April 2006) was an American-Canadian vigilante who searched publicly available sex offender registries in the United States for the names and addresses of convicted sex offenders before traveling to Maine in the Northeastern United States and murdering two.

Early life
Born in Fort Worth, Texas, Marshall moved with his family to Cape Breton, Nova Scotia when he was a child. His parents divorced in 1996. In 1999, Marshall moved to Culdesac, Idaho, with his father, Ralph, who served three years as mayor.  Marshall was charged with aggravated assault when he was 15, in April 2001, after he brought an AR-15 rifle onto his lawn where two youths were fighting. While his father went to live in Arizona, and later Maine, Marshall moved back to his mother's home in Cape Breton during the summer of 2003. He attempted to enlist in the Army, but was rejected because of his asthma.

Killings
Out of 34 sex offenders listed on the Maine registry, Marshall took down the information on 29 of them. He began his Maine trip with a visit to his father, now living in Houlton, Maine.

Because his car had broken down during the drive, he borrowed his father's truck, and took a .45 handgun from him. That night he shot and killed Joseph Gray, 57, in Milo, and William Elliott, 24, in Corinth. He had shot and killed Gray while sleeping in his living room. His wife woke up to their dogs barking. Gray had fallen asleep to watching Forensic Files prior to his killing. At 8:00 AM, Marshall arrived at Elliott's mobile home and knocked on his door, and shot him several times. Elliott's girlfriend took a picture of the license plate before Marshall left.

When police stopped the bus he was aboard that evening, he committed suicide by shooting himself in the head. Later investigation of the laptop he had brought with him indicated that he had gone to the residences of four other sex offenders.

Casualties 

 Joseph Gray, 57 (convicted of raping a child under 14)
 William Elliott, 24 (convicted of the statutory rape of his girlfriend, who was days away from her 16th birthday)

Aftermath 
After his suicide, authorities investigated his computer. They found an animation of Jesus armed with an assault rifle while knocking on someone's door. Witnesses reported that Marshall had converted to Christianity shortly before the killings. At one point, he referred to pedophiles as "scums of the Earth".

Cultural depictions
In 2018, filmmaker Marc Bisaillon released With Love (L'Amour), a thriller film inspired by Marshall's case.

References

Further reading

External links 
 CBC article

1985 births
2006 suicides
American emigrants to Canada
American murderers
American vigilantes
Canadian murderers
People from the Cape Breton Regional Municipality
People from Fort Worth, Texas
Suicides by firearm in Maine
Murder in Maine
Crimes in Maine
Vigilantism against sex offenders